Dan Wilde (born 24 December 1984) is an English singer-songwriter and musician from Blackpool, now living in Cambridge. He has released three solo albums so far, including With Fire in Mind  and Rhythm on the City Wall, which was  released in April 2016.

Career
While growing up, Wilde played in a number of bands. After taking a course in contemporary music in London, he took a degree in Jazz at the Leeds College of Music. After graduating, he wrote songs for his first solo album, where he worked with Ian Bailey and producer Gary Hall. For his second album, Wilde worked with Karl Odlum and Dave Gerard (from Gerard and the Watchmen).  His third album, "Rhythm on the City Wall", is released on 1 April 2016.

Wilde has supported Karine Polwart, Cara Dillon, Martin Taylor, Mark Geary, Karima Francis and Ezio and has played at Cambridge Folk Festival, Beverley Folk Festival and Moonbeams Festival. Wilde performed at the Moonbeams Festival in 2011. In 2011, he spent a month on tour in the east coast of the US, playing gigs from Maine to Nashville. In June and July 2013, he was on tour in Germany and toured again in Germany and Switzerland in 2014 and in Germany in January 2016.

Musical influences
Dan Wilde cites Bob Dylan, Neil Young, Tom Waits and Paul Simon among those who have influenced his music.

Discography

Albums
 This Is the Place (2011)
 With Fire in Mind (2013)
 Rhythm on the City Wall (2016)

References

External links
 Official Website
 Dan Wilde on MusicBrainz

1984 births
Living people
People from Blackpool
English male singers
English folk guitarists
English male guitarists
English folk singers
English male singer-songwriters
21st-century English singers
21st-century British guitarists
21st-century British male singers